2nd VFCC Awards
January 31, 2002

Best Film: 
 Memento 

Best Canadian Film: 
 Last Wedding 
The 2nd Vancouver Film Critics Circle Awards, honoring the best in filmmaking in 2001, were given on 31 January 2002.

Winners

International
Best Actor:
Steve Buscemi - Ghost World
Best Actress:
Sissy Spacek - In the Bedroom
Best Director:
Baz Luhrmann - Moulin Rouge!
Best Film: 
Memento

Canadian
Best Actor:
Benjamin Ratner - Last Wedding
Best Actress:
Frida Betrani - Last Wedding
Best Director:
Bruce Sweeney - Last Wedding
Best Film: 
Last Wedding
Best "Off-Indie":
Obachan's Garden

2001
2001 film awards
2001 in British Columbia
2001 in Canadian cinema